This was the first edition of the tournament.

Juan Ignacio Londero won the title, defeating Guido Pella in the final, 3–6, 7–5, 6–1. Notably, Londero had not won an ATP tour level match prior to the beginning of the tournament.

Seeds
The top four seeds received a bye into the second round.

Draw

Finals

Top half

Bottom half

Qualifying

Seeds

Qualifiers

Lucky losers

Qualifying draw

First qualifier

Second qualifier

Third qualifier

Fourth qualifier

References

External links
 Main Draw
 Qualifying Draw

2019 Singles
2019 ATP Tour
2019 in Argentine tennis